Stare Sioło  (Stare Selo) is a village in the administrative district of Gmina Oleszyce, within Lubaczów County, Subcarpathian Voivodeship, in south-eastern Poland.

The village has a population of 450.

References

Villages in Lubaczów County